The Thirteenth Street Terrace is a municipally-designated historic building located in the Nutana neighbourhood of Saskatoon, Saskatchewan, Canada.  The property is made up of two-storey row housing constructed between 1911 and 1912 in a Classical architectural style.  The row houses were built by  Henry A. Cook, liveryman, farmer, real estate salesman and owner of the Waldorf Café.

References

Buildings and structures in Saskatoon
Houses completed in 1912
1912 establishments in Saskatchewan